Christian I. Nyby II (born Christian Ib Nyby June 1, 1941) is an American television director, son of film editor and director Christian Nyby.

Education
Nyby graduated from Van Nuys High School in Van Nuys, California in 1959. He attended the University of Idaho for two years before transferring to the University of Southern California.

Career
Nyby was sent to South Vietnam as a photographer for the United States Air Force in 1963.

In 1967, Nyby became an assistant director for Ironside, and by 1972 received his first directing credits for Ironside episode "Find a Victim", and Adam-12 episode "The Tip". Nyby went on to direct multiple episodes of Emergency!, Battlestar Galactica, B. J. and the Bear, CHiPs, The A-Team, The Fall Guy, Hill Street Blues, Diagnosis: Murder and Walker, Texas Ranger. He directed the Tales of the Gold Monkey episode "Trunk From the Past", and the pilot episode of the unsold 1988 Remo Williams series. Nyby also directed numerous Perry Mason television movies in the late 1980s and early 1990s. Nyby's father, Christian Nyby, also a television director (as well as a film editor and director) directed multiple episodes of the original Perry Mason series.

Nyby considers his Hill Street Blues episodes as his favorites.

References

External links
 

1941 births
Living people
American television directors
American people of Danish descent
People from Los Angeles
United States Air Force airmen
University of Southern California alumni
University of Idaho alumni
United States Air Force personnel of the Vietnam War